Porumbești is a village in Cantemir District, Moldova.

References

Villages of Cantemir District